General elections were held in Palau on 6 November 2012. Former President Tommy Remengesau defeated his successor, incumbent Johnson Toribiong, who had been elected in 2008. Antonio Bells was elected Vice-President, defeating Kerai Mariur, who had finished first in the primary elections on 26 September.

Electoral system
The president and vice president elections had primary elections on 26 September, from which the top two candidates qualified for the presidential general election on 6 November.

15,305 voters registered to vote, an increase of 1,516 voters from the 2008 elections.

Results

President

Three candidates contested the presidential primary: Incumbent President Johnson Toribiong, former President Tommy Remengesau Jr., and former Vice President Sandra Pierantozzi, who served as vice president from 2001 to 2005. Remengesau and Toribiong, who placed first and second respectively in the primary, advanced to the general election.

Vice President
Four candidates contested the vice presidential primary election: 
 Antonio Bells, Former Speaker of House of Delegates of Palau
 Dr. Steven Kuartei, Minister of Health of Palau
 Kerai Mariur, Incumbent Vice President of Palau, first elected in 2008
 Jackson Ngiraingas, Public Infrastructure, Industries and Commerce Minister of Palau

Mariur and Bells, who placed first and second, advanced to the general election.

Senate

By candidate

House of Delegates

References

Elections in Palau
Palau
General
Non-partisan elections
Election and referendum articles with incomplete results